Peltonen is a Finnish occupational surname, which is derived from pelto, meaning "field" in English. Notable people with the surname include:

 Benjamin Peltonen, Finnish singer
 Juhani Peltonen, Finnish footballer
 Kirsi Peltonen, Finnish mathematician
 Mika Peltonen, Finnish Army Brigadier General
 Tuomas Peltonen, Finnish footballer
 Ville Peltonen, Finnish professional ice hockey forward

See also
 Peltonen (company), Finnish ski manufacturer

References

Finnish-language surnames
Occupational surnames